Sreten Stanić (Serbian Cyrillic: Сретен Станић; born February 15, 1984) is a former Serbian footballer.

Career
Bought from Rad in the winter of 2006 by Politehnica Timișoara, he moved to Dinamo București during the summer market of the same year. He usually plays on the left wing, as an attacking midfielder.

International career
Stanić was part of all Serbian National sides up to the U21 level, which he did not manage to reach.

References

External sources

1984 births
Living people
Sportspeople from Loznica
Serbian footballers
Association football midfielders
FK Rad players
FC Politehnica Timișoara players
FC Dinamo București players
Expatriate footballers in Romania
Liga I players
FK Banat Zrenjanin players
FK Čukarički players
Serbian SuperLiga players
FK Borac Banja Luka players